Conrad E. Hamilton (born November 5, 1974) is a former professional American football cornerback in the National Football League. He played  six seasons for the New York Giants and the Atlanta Falcons. He is now the coach for the Desert Mountain Wolves in Scottsdale Arizona.

During his career in the NFL, Hamilton played corner back. He accumulated 3 interceptions and returned for 64 yards and accumulating 144 solo tackles. He recorded one career sack. In 1998, Hamilton played in all 16 games for the Giants with 15 as a starter.

As a returner, he returned 19 kickoffs for 382 yards with a long of 29.

References

1974 births
Living people
Players of American football from New Mexico
American football cornerbacks
Eastern New Mexico Greyhounds football players
New Mexico Military Institute Broncos football players
New York Giants players
Atlanta Falcons players
People from Alamogordo, New Mexico